The Marstrand Regatta is a sailing event. It is held outside Marstrand in Sweden in July, and hosted by the Royal Gothenburg Yacht Club.

References

July sporting events
Sailing competitions in Sweden
Sport in Västra Götaland County
Västra Götaland County
Sailing regattas
Royal Gothenburg Yacht Club